Polypinus aquavitus, commonly known as the aquavit hachetfish, is a species of ray-finned fish in the genus Polyipnus. It is found in the Western Pacific Ocean. It has a depth range of 120 - 1244 meters.

References

Sternoptychidae
Fish described in 1971
Fish of the Pacific Ocean
Fish of Australia
Fish of New Zealand
Fish of Papua New Guinea